James Merriman is a Canadian soccer coach who is currently the head coach of Pacific FC in the Canadian Premier League.

Playing career
Merriman played NCAA Division I soccer with the University of Denver Pioneers. His senior career included stints with Colorado Rapids Reserves, Victoria Highlanders FC, and Colorado Lightning.

Coaching career

Early career
Merriman served as assistant coach of Vancouver Island University from 2009 to 2011 and at Simon Fraser University from 2012 to 2013. He also coached in various roles with the Whitecaps FC Academy.

Pacific FC 
James Merriman was hired as an assistant coach under Michael Silberbauer for the inaugural season of Pacific FC and the Canadian Premier League. That 2019 season was disappointing for Pacific, and Silberbauer was fired before Pacific's final game of the year. This gave Merriman the opportunity to take the reins as interim manager, and he managed Pacific to a 2–0 victory over Valour FC to close out the season in fifth place.

Ahead of the 2020 season, Pacific hired Pa-Modou Kah as the new head coach and retained Merriman as his assistant. The season saw improvement for Pacific as the club finished the CPL season in fourth.

The 2021 season was even better as Pacific managed to win the 2021 Canadian Premier League Final to become league champions and also went on an impressive run in the Canadian Championship. Following the season, Kah departed the club to manage North Texas SC and Merriman was named as Pacific's new head coach.

References

External links
 Denver Pioneers men's soccer statistics

1985 births
Living people
Canadian soccer coaches
Pacific FC non-playing staff
Soccer people from British Columbia
Sportspeople from Nanaimo
Victoria Highlanders players
Canadian soccer players
Association football midfielders
Canadian Premier League coaches